Mikhaylovka is a rural locality (a selo) in Kizhinginsky District, Republic of Buryatia, Russia. The population was 560 as of 2010. There are 7 streets.

Geography 
Mikhaylovka is located 49 km east of Kizhinga (the district's administrative centre) by road. Mogsokhon is the nearest rural locality.

References 

Rural localities in Kizhinginsky District